PSA International Pte Ltd is a port operator and supply chain company, with flagship operations in Singapore and Antwerp. One of the largest port operators in the world, PSA has terminals across 26 countries, including deepsea, rail and inland facilities. PSA is also involved in distripark and marine services.

History
Under the 1912 Straits Settlements Port Ordinance, the Singapore Harbour Board was formed on 1 July 1913. On 1 April 1964, the Port of Singapore Authority came into being under the 1963 Port of Singapore Authority Ordinance to replace the Singapore Harbour Board and several organisations that have been operating in the port.

In the 1970s, PSA started building a container port in Singapore, and in 1972, handled their first container ship. A decade later, they reached the milestone of one-million-TEU of number of containers processed. They later reached the 5 million TEU mark by 1990, making Singapore at the time as the world’s largest container port. The company became a global operator after it first started its global expansion in 1966 through port interests in Dalian, China.

A parliamentary bill was passed on 25 August 1997 to turn the Port of Singapore Authority, a state organisation into an independent commercial company. PSA Corporation Limited was thus corporatised on 1 October 1997. The company kept the initials “PSA” as its brand name but it is no longer an acronym. The regulatory functions of the former authority were transferred to Singapore's new maritime regulator, the Maritime and Port Authority of Singapore (MPA).

In order to focus on its core port business, PSA Corporation set up The HarbourFront Limited (present day Mapletree) on 7 December 2000 to spearhead development of its properties.

Following a restructuring exercise in December 2003, PSA International Pte Ltd became the holding company for the PSA Group of companies.

in March 2022, it was announced by PSA International and Halifax Port Authority that PSA has acquired the Fairview Cove Container Terminal (Ceres Halifax Inc.) from Nippon Yusen Kabushiki Kaisha.

PSA Marine
PSA Marine Pte Ltd, a wholly owned subsidiary of PSA International, provides marine services to the maritime and shipping community. They include pilotage and port and terminal towage. PSA Marine owns and operates a fleet of over 80 vessels in Singapore, Malaysia, Hong Kong, China, India, Australia and Oman.

References

External links
 
 Port of Singapore Authority Infopedia page
 Singapore Harbour Board Infopedia page
 SG Bicentennial: A Port's Story - a video series about the history of the port of Singapore, produced by PSA Singapore in 2019 to commemorate Singapore's Bicentennial.

1997 establishments in Singapore
Transport companies established in 1997
Government-owned companies of Singapore
Port operating companies
Temasek Holdings
Transport operators of Singapore
Singaporean brands